The list of ship launches in 2004 includes a chronological list of ships launched in 2004.  In cases where no official launching ceremony was held, the date built or completed may be used instead.


References

See also 

2004
 Ship launches
 Ship launches
Ship launches